John Bargfeldt is an American softball coach who is the current assistant coach and pitching coach at Oklahoma State. He is the former head coach at Tulsa.

Coaching career
On June 21, 2005, Bargfeldt was announced as the new head coach of the Tulsa softball program. On June 6, 2019, he announced his resignation as head softball coach at Tulsa to pursue better opportunities.

On June 14, 2019, Bargfeldt was announced as the new pitching coach of the Oklahoma State softball program.

Head coaching record
Sources:

College

References

Living people
American softball coaches
Anderson Ravens baseball players
Tulsa Golden Hurricane softball coaches
Oklahoma State Cowgirls softball coaches
Georgia Tech Yellow Jackets softball coaches
Baseball players from Indiana
Sportspeople from Gary, Indiana
People from Gary, Indiana
Gulf Coast Cubs players
Pompano Beach Cubs players
Quad Cities Cubs players
1955 births